Stenoptilodes juanfernandicus is a moth of the family Pterophoridae that is known from Chile and Ecuador.

Adults are on wing from December to March.

External links

juanfernandicus
Moths described in 1991
Moths of South America